Al-Shabab Sports Club is a Syrian football club based in Raqqa. It was founded in 1962. They play their home games at the Raqqa Stadium.

References

Shabab
Association football clubs established in 1962
1962 establishments in Syria